Dothan High School is a public co-educational institution encompassing grades 10 to 12. The high school is located in the southeastern portion of the state of Alabama in Dothan, and has the 36th-largest high school student population in the state. The school won two football state titles during the 1980s.

Athletics
The school colors are cardinal and Vegas gold; their mascot is a wolf. The school includes football, baseball, basketball, softball, soccer, track, tennis, golf, cross-country, and volleyball.

Football
Northview is part of an active traditional football rivalry with crosstown Dothan High School. This was highlighted in a commencement speech First Lady Laura Bush gave at nearby Enterprise High School on May 31, 2008, when she mentioned Northview and Dothan as significant victories for Enterprise.

In 2002, former University of Alabama head football coach Mike DuBose took over as head football coach at Northview High School. He had previously been named Southeastern Conference Coach of the Year for the Crimson Tide before poor seasons and personal controversy caused his firing in 2000. Dothan City school board members voted to hire DuBose, who came in with a wave of publicity and high expectations. However, the Cougars finished with an 0–10 record for the season and DuBose was gone at the end of the year.

This was part of a tumultuous period for Northview football, which saw 39 consecutive losses from 2000 to 2004. The team had won the Alabama State Playoff Championships in both 1981 and 1985, and made it to the playoffs five times during the 1990s.

Notable alumni

 Lawrence Dawsey – All-American football player from Florida State University and former NFL player (Tampa Bay Buccaneers) part of state championship at Northview in 1985
 Gabe Gross – college football and baseball at Auburn University and professional baseball player (Tampa Bay Rays)
 Kevin Jackson – All-American defensive back at Alabama in 1996
 Izell Reese – former NFL player for the Dallas Cowboys
 Larry Roberts – former NFL player, part of state championship at Northview in 1981. He won two Super Bowl championships, 1989 and 1990 with the San Francisco 49ers
 Clint Robinson, Former MLB player (Washington Nationals)
 Jamie Thomas – professional skateboarder and entrepreneur (dropped out before graduation)

References

Public high schools in Alabama
Buildings and structures in Dothan, Alabama
Educational institutions established in 1978
Schools in Houston County, Alabama
1978 establishments in Alabama